Flare fittings are a type of compression fitting used with metal tubing, usually soft steel, ductile (soft) copper and aluminum, though other materials are also used.  In a flare fitting the tube itself is "flared" i.e. expanded and deformed at the end. The flare is then pressed against the fitting it connects to and is secured by a close-fitting nut that ensures that no leakage happens. Tube flaring is a type of forging operation, and is usually a cold working procedure.  During assembly, a flare nut is used to secure the flared tubing's tapered end to the also tapered fitting, producing a pressure-resistant, leak-tight seal. Flared connections offer a high degree of long-term reliability and for this reason are often used in mission-critical and inaccessible locations.  

The tool used to flare tubing consists of a die that grips the tube, and either a mandrel or rolling cone is forced into the end of the tube to form the flare by cold working. 

The most common flare fitting standards in use today are the 45° SAE flare, the 37° JIC flare, and the 37° AN flare.

SAE 45° flare connections are commonly used in automotive applications, as well as for refrigeration and air conditioning. SAE fittings are typically made from brass. SAE and AN/JIC connections are incompatible due to the different flare angle.

JIC 37° flare connections are used in higher pressure hydraulic applications.  JIC fittings are typically steel or stainless steel. JIC fittings are not permissible where AN connections are specified, due to differing quality standards.

AN 37° flare connections are typically specified for military and aerospace applications.  Fittings can be made from a large variety of materials. The “AN” standard (for Army/Navy) has been replaced by other military and aerospace standards, though in practice these fittings are still referred to as AN. 

Flared fittings are an alternative to solder-type joints that are mechanically separable and doesn’t require an open flame. Copper tube used for propane, liquefied petroleum gas, or natural gas may use flared brass fittings of single 45°-flare type, according to NFPA 54/ANSI. Z223.1 National Fuel Gas Code. Many plumbing codes, towns, and water companies require copper tube used for water service to be type-L or type-K. All National Model Codes permit the use of flare fitting joints, however, the authority having jurisdiction (AHJ) should be consulted to determine acceptance for a specific application.

See also 
 Flare-nut wrench
 Pipe fitting
 Sweat fitting

References

External links
Flared Joints
SAE thread chart, showing the dimensions of tubing and fittings
JIC thread chart, showing the dimensions of tubing and fittings

Plumbing